Śniadecki is a surname. Notable people with the surname include:

 Jan Śniadecki (1756–1830), Polish mathematician, philosopher, and astronomer
 Jędrzej Śniadecki (1768–1838), Polish writer, physician, chemist, and biologist, brother of Jan

Polish-language surnames